Adisak Hantes (born 13 November 1995) is a Thai professional footballer who plays as a left-back for Thai League 1 club PT Prachuap.

References

External links
 

1992 births
Living people
Adisak Hantes
Adisak Hantes
Association football defenders
Adisak Hantes
Adisak Hantes
Adisak Hantes
Adisak Hantes
Adisak Hantes